Khotmyzhsk is a rural locality (a selo) and the administrative center of Khotmyzhskoye Rural Settlement, Borisovsky District, Belgorod Oblast, Russia. The population was 1,076 as of 2010. There are 26 streets.

Geography 
Khotmyzhsk is located 15 km east of Borisovka (the district's administrative centre) by road. Belenkoye is the nearest rural locality.

References 

Rural localities in Borisovsky District
Grayvoronsky Uyezd